Skyler David Rude (born 1986) is an American politician. A Republican, he has served in the Washington House of Representatives since January 3, 2019. He was elected in 2018 to succeed retiring Republican Terry Nealey. Rude is the only openly gay Republican in the statehouse.

Career
Rude is regarded as a moderate and bipartisan Republican while identifying as a fiscal conservative.

According to his public site, Rude serves on "the Legislative Evaluation and Accountability Program Committee, Joint Higher Education Committee, Joint Task Force on Community and Technical College Counselors, the Capitol Furnishings Preservation Committee, the LGBTQ Commission, and the National Conference of State Legislature's Nuclear Legislative Working Group. He has also been appointed to serve on an internal task force tasked with exploring remote-testimony for committee hearings in the state House."

In 2019, Rude co-sponsored House Resolution 4621 which encourages the state House to pursue a remote-testimony pilot program, as well as directs the Executive Rules Committee to take up the matter by Oct. 1, 2019. "We need to reduce the barriers for the public to participate in the legislative process. In this technologically advanced age, we should be doing our best to ensure access to the process", Rude said, according to a media release.

Awards 
 2020 Guardians of Small Business. Presented by NFIB.

Personal life
Previous to being a state representative, he was on the Walla Walla Parks and Recreation Advisory Board and College Place. He was Senator Maureen Walsh's legislative assistant and advocated for sexual harassment prevention. He is openly gay.

References

Living people
Republican Party members of the Washington House of Representatives
People from Walla Walla, Washington
21st-century American politicians
LGBT state legislators in Washington (state)
Gay politicians
Walla Walla Community College alumni
1986 births